Gordon Tumilson (born July 17, 1951) is a Canadian former professional ice hockey goaltender.

During the 1972–73 season, Tumilson played three games in the World Hockey Association (WHA) with the Winnipeg Jets.

References

External links

1951 births
Living people
Canadian ice hockey goaltenders
Greensboro Generals (SHL) players
Ice hockey people from Winnipeg
Winnipeg Jets (WHA) players